"The Recluse" is the fourth single from Plan B's second album The Defamation of Strickland Banks. The single was released on 4 October 2010. "The Recluse" has been labeled as "one of his best singles to date" by critics, "neatly marrying poignancy and aggression into a 4-minute-long track with a surplus of scaling strings and his voice showing more desperation for release than ever before." This song was covered by George Michael during his "Symphonica" tour.

Music video
The music video for "The Recluse" was directed by Daniel Wolfe and shows Strickland Banks, played by Plan B, during his time in prison, as well as flashbacks of his life before prison. It was first aired online on YouTube on September 14, 2010. Actress Vicky McClure plays Strickland Banks' girlfriend. At the start of the video a snippet of "The Ballad of Belmarsh" can be heard.

Track listing
 UK CD single
 "The Recluse" – 3:19
 "The Recluse" (Nero Remix) – 4:36
 "The Recluse" (Netsky Remix) – 4:56

 UK Promotional CD single
 "The Recluse" (Nero Remix) – 4:36
 "The Recluse" (Nero Instrumental) – 4:36
 "The Recluse" (Netsky Remix) – 4:56
 "The Recluse" (Netsky Edit) – 3:08

 UK 12" vinyl
 "The Recluse" – 3:19
 "The Recluse" (Nero Remix) – 4:36
 "The Recluse" (Netsky Remix) – 4:56

 Digital download - Remix
 "The Recluse" (Nero Remix) – 4:36

 Digital download - Remix
 "The Recluse" (Netsky Remix) – 4:56

Personnel
 Plan B – vocals, producer

Production
 Eric Appapoulay – additional producer
 David McEwan – engineer
 Mark "Top" Rankin – mixing

Additional musicians
 Tom Wright-Goss – guitar
 Eric Appapoulay – bass
 Richard Cassell – drums

Chart performance

References

External links
 
 
 

2010 singles
679 Artists singles
Atlantic Records UK singles
British soul songs
Plan B (musician) songs
Songs written by Plan B (musician)
2009 songs